Riccardo Ferri  (born 20 August 1963) is an Italian former footballer who played as a defender, in the role of centre-back. Despite being a well regarded, attentive, and reliable defender throughout his career, he holds the unusual and unfortunate record of the most own goals in Serie A history, alongside Franco Baresi, scoring in his own net on 8 occasions throughout his thirteen-year Inter career. At international level, he represented Italy at the 1984 Summer Olympics, at UEFA Euro 1988, and at the 1990 FIFA World Cup.

His older brother Giacomo was also a footballer and is currently a member of the technical staff at Torino.

Club career
Ferri was born in Crema, in Lombardy, and debuted in Serie A with Internazionale in October 1981. Soon a first-team defender, he became a mainstay of the team's starting eleven, playing for Internazionale for a total of 13 seasons.

With Inter, he won the 1981–82 Coppa Italia, followed by Inter's record breaking Scudetto and 1989 Supercoppa Italiana win during the 1988–89 Serie A season, and two UEFA Cups; the first in 1991, and the second in 1994. In 1994, he went to Sampdoria together with teammate Walter Zenga, in exchange for Gianluca Pagliuca, retiring two seasons later.

International career
After representing his country at under-21 level in the 1984 (third place) and 1986 (second place) under-21 European championships, Ferri went on to receive 45 caps for Italy senior national team, scoring 4 goals. He made his senior international debut on 6 December 1986, in a 2–0 away win against Malta, and marking his first international appearance by scoring a goal; he made his final Italy appearance in 1992. He played for Italy in Euro 1988, where Italy reached the semi-finals, and in the 1990 World Cup on home soil, where Italy managed a third-place finish after a penalty shoot-out defeat to defending champions Argentina in the semi-finals. He also competed for Italy at the 1984 Summer Olympics, where Italy finished in fourth place after a semi-final defeat.

Style of play
A world-class, tenacious, and combative defender, with excellent man-marking abilities, Ferri usually played in the role of centre-back. Although he possessed good technique, he preferred to mainly focus on the defensive aspect of the game rather than attempting to build plays from the back; however, he occasionally took free-kicks. He also excelled in the air and was known for his ability to anticipate his opponents. The Dutch former Milan striker Marco van Basten named Ferri and Pietro Vierchowod as two of the best defenders he ever faced.

Coaching career
Riccardo Ferri was in charge of the Inter Academy Florida based in Broward County, Florida (north of Miami), before being appointed to the role of Inter Club Manager on July 25 2022, replacing Lele Oriali.

Honours
Inter
Serie A: 1988–89
Coppa Italia: 1981–82
Supercoppa Italiana: 1989
UEFA Cup: 1990–91, 1993–94

Italy
FIFA World Cup: 1990 (third place)

Individual
Pirata d'Oro (Internazionale Player Of The Year): 1988

Orders
 5th Class / Knight: Cavaliere Ordine al Merito della Repubblica Italiana: 1991

References

1963 births
Living people
People from Crema, Lombardy
Association football defenders
Italian footballers
Serie A players
Italy international footballers
Olympic footballers of Italy
Italy youth international footballers
Italy under-21 international footballers
Inter Milan players
U.C. Sampdoria players
Footballers at the 1984 Summer Olympics
UEFA Euro 1988 players
1990 FIFA World Cup players
UEFA Cup winning players
Sportspeople from the Province of Cremona
Footballers from Lombardy
Knights of the Order of Merit of the Italian Republic